The Prêmio Craque do Brasileirão is an award given by the Brazilian Football Confederation (known as CBF) and TV Globo for the best players, head coaches, and referees of the Série A.

Player of the Year ("Craque do Brasileirão")

Team of the Year

Winners
Players marked bold won the "Best Player award" in that respective year.

Most appearances

Additional categories

Best Fan's Player ("Craque da Galera")

Top goalscorer

Best Newcomer

Best Foreign Player

Most Beautiful Goal

Most Beautiful Save

Fair Play award

Most Supporting Fans

Best Referee

Coaching awards

Best Coach

Breakthrough Coach

Tribute

Hosts

Women's football
From the 2021 season onwards, the awards given for the male players by the CBF, were also given for the best players of the Campeonato Brasileiro de Futebol Feminino Série A1, using the same criteria as of for male players.

Best player

Team of the year

Most appearances

Additional categories

See also
 Bola de Ouro

References

Brazilian football trophies and awards
Campeonato Brasileiro Série A
Annual events in Brazil